Ebby Halliday (born Vera Lucille Koch; March 9, 1911 – September 8, 2015) was an American realtor and businesswoman who founded Ebby Halliday Realtors.

She was one of the first successful female entrepreneurs in Dallas and is recognized as the "First Lady of Real Estate". John S. Baen, a professor of real estate at the University of North Texas in Denton comments, ''she was the first woman to enter what was a chauvinistic profession in a macho state'' and that ''she beat those ol' boys at their own game.''

Halliday was born in Leslie, Arkansas, and graduated from high school in Abilene, Kansas, in 1929. She got a $10-a-week job selling women's hats at The Jones Store in Kansas City. In less than a year, she was the top salesperson. In 1938, she was asked to take over the millinery department at Dallas' W.A. Green Store. Soon she had her own Dallas boutique, Ebby's Hats. She founded her real estate company in 1945.

Halliday married former FBI agent Maurice Acers in 1965. Maurice Acers died in 1993. She celebrated her 100th birthday on March 9, 2011. She died at the age of 104 on September 8, 2015 in her sleep, with her friends and family by her side.

Halliday received the Horatio Alger Award in 2005.

See also
 List of centenarians (businesspeople)

References

External links
Ebby Halliday, 98, visits client, 97 – The Dallas Morning News
Official site
Top 280 Companies ranked by 2003 sales volume – realtor.org
February 2006 Newsletter – Farmers Branch Chamber of Commerce
Yellow Rose Named For Texas Legend Ebby Halliday

1911 births
2015 deaths
People from Abilene, Kansas
People from Dallas
American real estate businesspeople
American centenarians
People from Searcy County, Arkansas
Women centenarians